The Canadian Taxpayers Federation (CTF) is a federally incorporated, non-profit organization in Canada. It claimed 30,517 donors and 215,009 supporters in 2018–19. Voting membership, however, is restricted to the board of directors. According to its by-laws, the board "can have as few as three and as many as 20" members. In 2017, it reportedly had a voting membership of six board members, and in 2020 it had four.

It describes itself as a taxpayers advocacy group, and the organization advocates lower taxes, less waste, and an increase in government accountability. It was founded in Saskatchewan in 1990 through a merger of the Association of Saskatchewan Taxpayers and the Resolution One Association of Alberta.

The CTF maintains a federal office in Ottawa, and has staff based in Calgary, Vancouver, Victoria, Edmonton, Regina, Toronto, Montreal and Halifax. Provincial offices conduct research and advocacy activities specific to their provinces, and act as regional organizers of Canada-wide initiatives.  The group opened the office in Halifax, partly due to a pension scandal in September 2010. In February 2016, the CTF hired its first Quebec Director, based in Montreal.

The federation uses a combination of e-mail, media interviews, press conferences, speeches, presentations, stunts, petitions and publications to advocate its political views. The CTF publishes The Taxpayer magazine three times a year, sends regular e-mail 'Action Updates', hosts a website/blog and Facebook page and issues opinion commentaries to media outlets.

Funding and structure
In 2019 the CTF had 215,000 supporters. In 2018-19 it received $5.1 million from 30,517 donations. The CTF receives no funding from government. Like all non-profits, it pays no taxes and its donors can choose to remain anonymous.

CTF is a member organization of and receives support from the Atlas Network, State Policy Network and a variety of other organizations in the United States.

The organization has spokespeople who address issues on a regional basis. CTF staff and board directors are prohibited from holding a membership in or donating funds to any political party and is independent of any institutional affiliations.

Board of directors
The Canadian Taxpayers Federation has a volunteer board of directors. Its mission is to maintain the integrity of the organization, conduct, strategic planning, and finances. It must approve goals, tactics, a budget on an annual basis and members are prohibited from holding a membership in any political party.

Current board of directors 
As of 2020 the CTF board of directors is composed of Michelle Eaton (Chair), Ken Azzopardi, Melissa Mathieson, and George Marshall.

Former directors
Politicians with roots in the federation include Alberta Premier Jason Kenney, who was the federation's CEO in the early 1990s. Former Alberta Director and National Research Director Derek Fildebrandt was previously an MLA for Strathmore-Brooks. Former Alberta director John Carpay was a Reform Party candidate in the riding of Burnaby-Kingsway in the 1993 federal election, and is now president of the Justice Centre for Constitutional Freedoms. Walter Robinson, CTF federal director from 1998 to 2004, left the position to run as a Conservative in the 2004 federal election in Ottawa-Orléans.

John Williamson, a former Federal Director, is the Member of Parliament for the riding of New Brunswick Southwest Adrienne Batra, the CTF's former Manitoba Director is now the Toronto Sun's editor-in-chief and previously worked as press secretary to then Toronto Mayor Rob Ford. Mark Milke, the CTF's former Alberta and BC Director has worked with various free-market thinktanks. David Maclean, the CTF's former Saskatchewan Director is now Vice President with the Canadian Manufacturers & Esporters. Former Research Director Adam Taylor is currently the principal and co-founder of Export Action Global. Former Alberta Director Mitch Gray is an entrepreneur who owns many businesses in Alberta and abroad. Former Saskatchewan Director Richard Truscott is currently Vice President, British Columbia and Alberta, for the Canadian Federation of Independent Businesses. Former Manitoba Director Victor Vrisnik is currently government affairs manager for 7-11 Canada. Former Ontario Director Tasha Kheiriddin is a journalist and hosted her own show on Global News Radio 640 in Toronto. Former Ontario Director Candice Malcolm is a columnist for the Sun newspaper chain and founder of True North Initiative. Former BC Director Jordan Bateman is now the Director of Marketing and Communications for the Independent Contractors and Businesses Association.

In 2006, many of the federation's provincial directors had roots in conservative parties. Ontario director Tasha Kheiriddin, who co-authored Rescuing Canada's Right: Blueprint for a Conservative Revolution with future CTF chair, Adam Daifallah,.in 2005 was president of the Progressive Conservative (PC) Youth Federation from 1994 to 1998. She later served as a ministerial aide in the government of Ontario PC premier Mike Harris. Adrienne Batra of the Manitoba office worked as a staff person for the Saskatchewan Party in Saskatchewan.  Sara MacIntyre, the federation's BC director, worked as a researcher in the Conservative Party of Canada's leader's office in Ottawa.  After leaving CTF, she became Prime Minister Stephen Harper's press secretary.

Activities
CTF initiatives include public relations campaigns and paid advertising. Public policy campaigns are intended to incorporate greater involvement and support from the general public. Their representatives regularly appear before legislative hearings and committees. Its directors publish annual detailed pre-budget submissions, as well as reports on public issues including health care, tax reform, and "whistle blower" and freedom of information legislation. The CTF advocates for public policy issues and legislation related to direct democracy, taxpayers protection legislation, and the Canada Pension Plan.

Government spending
The organization regularly comments on government spending, and in 1993 built a "debt clock" to display the per-second increase of Canadian's debt and the share owed by each family. The clock was resurrected in 2011 to show the federal debt per capita. The clock is still used at events across the country, most recently in the summer of 2016 when the debt clock was toured across the country by Federal Director Aaron Wudrick to raise awareness of Canada's growing debt burden. There is also an online version at debtclock.ca.

In 1995 the organization also organized 19 Tax Alert rallies to promote lower taxes.   The rallies were attended by 20,000 Canadians, and gathered 233,000 petition signatures.  At this time, the organization also encouraged governments to adopt legislation requiring budgets to be balanced. Ontario PC Leader Mike Harris signed the pledge drafted by CTF that stated he would not increase taxes without gaining voter approval first.

Events

Gas Tax Honesty Day
Gas Tax Honesty Day is a day where the organization advocates for federal and provincial governments to end the practice of calculating the GST or HST after it has already levied provincial and federal excise taxes on gasoline. The organization has organized this occasion for 20 years as of 2018. CTF reported that Canada collected $1.6 billion in additional taxes due to this practice. To calculate the costs of these practices the organization publishes yearly reports. The 2018 report shows that on average taxes make 33% of the pump price for gasoline and 30% diesel. It also shows that tax-on- tax on gas costs an extra 3 cents per liter on average, allowing governments to rake in an additional $1.84 billion in revenue.

TaxFighter Award
The TaxFighter Award given by the organization to Canadian citizens which it believes demonstrates commitment and dedication to the cause of "taxpayer emancipation." The awards have been given since 2000. Some of the most recent winners include Former premier Ralph Klein and his first finance minister Jim Dinning for passing balanced budgets without increasing taxes. Other past winners include Dave Rutherford, a talk radio host, has also received the award after being on the air for 42 years.  In 2007, it was granted to three people: National Post & Edmonton Journal columnist Lorne Gunter, Winnipeg Sun columnist Tom Brodbeck, and Edmonton senior Patricia Ehli. In 2000, CTF awarded Mike Harris the award for the passage of the Taxpayer Protection and Balanced Budget Act.

Recent History of the Award Winners

Teddy Awards
The "Teddies" are awarded to government entities and politicians wasteful spending or high taxes. Founded in 1999, The Teddies are named after Ted Weatherill, a former Chairman of the Canada Labour Relations Board who was terminated in 1998 for expenses incompatible with his position.  The expenses included $150,000 in meals over eight years and over $700 for a lunch in Paris.

Three golden sows are awarded federally, provincially and a lifetime achievement to any bureaucrat, politician, government or government agency every February.

History of Award Winners

The 2006 Provincial/Municipal Teddy was awarded to the Manitoba provincial government for "Special Achievement in Cosmetic Makeover and Budget Misallocation". The CTF accused the Winnipeg Regional Health Authority of spending money on unnecessary cosmetic surgery, including $981,000 for 218 abdominoplasty and other fat-reducing surgeries, and $10,900 for 31 vials of Botox. The following day the Winnipeg Free Press printed a follow-up story ("Foolish funding? Not a bit, MDs say") with information from Manitoba doctors indicating that the expenditures were for necessary medical treatments. The abdominoplasties were performed on patients with chronic stomach infections that did not respond to antibiotics, while the botulinum toxin was used to treat spastic muscle disorders such as multiple sclerosis.

On March 9, 2006 the Canadian Taxpayers Federation announced a withdrawal of the Teddy Award given to the government of Manitoba. The withdrawal claimed that a December 4, 2005 story in the Winnipeg Sun implied that the Botox treatments and abdominoplasties were for cosmetic purposes.

Initiatives

Generation Screwed 
Generation Screwed, is a non-partisan campus-based movement seeking to raise awareness on the issues of government debt and unfunded liabilities, and how they affect young Canadians. Founded in 2013 as a Canadian Taxpayers Federation initiative, the movement is currently the biggest free-market oriented campus initiative in Canada, with active clubs on 29 campuses across nine provinces.

Commentary

Government salaries and pensions
The CTF regularly comments on salaries and pensions of legislators, and is the only organization to regularly calculate and release details about politicians' pensions and benefits.  It also has continually advocated against tax-free allowances, which exempt a part of legislators' salaries from income tax. CTF advocated fully taxable salaries in Ontario, BC, Manitoba, Alberta, and Saskatchewan. These provinces made salaries fully taxable, although in 2007 British Columbia reinstated tax-free allowances.

In 1995, It put out 242 pigs on the Parliament Hill lawn to represent MPs who said they would join the new pension plan.

In 2006, the organization advocated that Calgary also remove tax-free allowances for municipal councillors.

In 2010, the organization began publishing reports on the ratio of funding for pensions between taxpayers and legislators. In June it was released that the ratio for the members of parliament was $4 for every $1 contributed by a parliamentarian.  A more recent report showed that in New Brunswick the ratio was $16 to every $1, and for Nova Scotia it was $22 to every $1.  The pension plan costs taxpayers $7.5 million annually.  In Nova Scotia, 24 MLA's could collect $23 million in benefits if they live till they are 75.  CTF has advocated that the pension plans be changed to have equal contributions from taxpayers and legislators, and for a citizen's oversight body to make recommendations for MLA compensation.

In reaction to the report, former Nova Scotia Premier Darrell Dexter said that he was open to reviewing the process for pensions, but that he was not ready to review it at the time.  Dexter was slated to collect $2 million in pension benefits.

During 2012, the CTF ran a national campaign to get MPs to reform their pensions. They launched billboards across the country targeting the $24 to $1 contribution ratio (taxpayers to MPs), ran a video in Toronto bar and gym bathrooms, and flew an airplane towing a banner behind it over Parliament Hill demanding pension reform. After years of CTF advocacy, MPs reformed their pensions in October 2012, significantly reducing overall benefit levels for current and future Members of Parliament.

In 2013, CTF began demanding that convicted politicians lose their pensions.

Taxes
From 2003 to 2008, CTF worked to abolish the Alberta Health Premium, criticizing it for not funding health care, having high administrative costs, and for being a "regressive tax".  In 2008, Premier Ed Stelmach abolished the tax, which had previously brought in $900 million to the province's general revenue fund.  The tax cut saved individuals $528 and families $1,056 on average.

Starting in 1997, CTF worked to put an end to what was called "bracket creep," where tax brackets were not released indexed to inflation. This resulted in numerous Canadians being bumped up to a higher tax bracket, despite not being any wealthier in real terms. The organization launched a national campaign to fight this practice both federally and provincially. The campaign worked an put an end to bracket creep federally in 2000. Other provinces followed suit. The last province to put an end to this practice was Manitoba in 2017. As of 2020, bracket creep remains a reality in Alberta, Saskatchewan, Prince Edward Island, and Nova Scotia 

In 2015 CTF organized the no side for the transit tax referendum in British Columbia's Lower Mainland, proposing a 0.5% increase in the local sales tax to finance transit infrastructure in the greater Vancouver area. Despite being outspent more than 160-to-1 by the yes side, the CTF no side won the referendum with 61.7% of the popular vote.

By 2020, the government of British Columbia fully eliminated MSP premiums after years of advocacy by the CTF.

The organization holds an annual "Gas Tax Honesty" day. As of 2010, over 150,000 Canadians signed the CTF's gas tax petition demanding lower and dedicated fuel taxes.  The organization advocates that fuel taxes be dedicated to a "municipal roadway trust" and not to general spending. Manitoba and Saskatchewan have passed legislation requiring the fuel tax be dedicated to roads.

Government transparency
In 1990 the CTF led a petition drive in Saskatchewan and Alberta which led to the implementation of freedom of information legislation (FOI). The organization also organized advocates in British Columbia and Manitoba to oppose the weakening of existing FOI laws.  CTF also participates in "Right to Know Week", where multiple organizations advocate more open government.

In 2009, CTF joined the Canadian Newspaper Association and BC Freedom of Information and Privacy Association requesting that the Prime Minister follow U.S. President Barack Obama's example and post details of stimulus spending online.

More recently, the organization demanded that Members of the Legislative Assembly of Alberta (MLAs) post their credit card receipts and expenses online, and that the Legislative Assembly's expenses be subject to the Freedom of Information and Protection of Privacy Act. This was in addition to a petition to have members of parliament (MPs) and senators be audited after audits of the British parliament and Nova Scotia members revealed wasteful and unethical spending.  In June, the House of Commons agreed to allow spot audits but would not allow the release the names of those being audited.

CTF also supported Ontario PC Member of Provincial Parliament Lisa MacLeod's effort to disclose all contracts and grants over $10,000 and travel/hospitality expenses.

In 2012, the Alberta government began requiring 400 senior staff and MLAs to post expenses, including receipts, online.

Aboriginal policy reform
In 2002, Gordon Benoit went to court in Ottawa, saying that an oral promise made to his ancestors in 1899 exempted him and all Treaty 8 Indians from paying taxes. Benoit was challenged by the CTF who argued that a race-based tax exemption would violate equality provisions, international treaties and the basic principles of fairness.  In March 2002, Benoit won his first case when Judge Douglas Campbell ruled in his favour.  However, CTF appealed the decision and the second ruling was in their favor, with the Supreme Court dismissing the case in 2004.

In December 2009, the CTF worked with a whistleblower in Manitoba to expose what it referred to as outrageous salaries on the Peguis First Nation. While disclosing the pay to the media, the CTF began a long campaign to convince the federal government to begin posting the salaries of all aboriginal politicians' pay online as well as each reserve's annual audit documents.

In November 2010, with data obtained through access to information requests, they released a report that revealed for 2008-09 that over 80 reserve politicians earned more than the after-tax income of $184,000 of Prime Minister Stephen Harper in the same period. 222 reserve politicians were paid more in tax-free income in 2008-09 than their respective provincial premiers, who averaged an after-tax income of $109,893. One reserve politician in Atlantic Canada was found to have been paid a combined tax-free salary and honorarium totaling $978,468. The amounts for reserve politicians included travel and per diems in comparison to the base salary of other politicians

In 2013, the federal government passed bill C-27 requiring all aboriginal bands to disclose on a public website their compensation amounts. After the federal government's decision to put on hold numerous enforcement measures in 2015  resulting in a much lower compliance rate, the CTF helped First Nations activist Charmaine Stick to mount a court battle with the Onion Lake Cree Nation so that it would release its finances. In 2017 they claimed victory after a Saskatchewan court ordered Onion Lake Cree Nation to disclose its finances. The judgment was upheld by the Saskatchewan Court of Appeals in 2018.

Canadian Firearms Registry
The organization has opposed the Canadian Firearms Registry, calling it "ill-conceived crime-fighting measure that did little more than add paperwork and expenses for hunters, farmers and recreational gun users." In 2010, the CTF supported private member's bill C-391 which would have eliminated the registry. The federal government eliminated the registry in April 2012 with the passing of bill C-19.

See also

 Fraser Institute

References

External links

CTF Blog
Canadian Debt Clock
Canadian Taxpayers Federation, YouTube
Canadian Taxpayers Federation, Facebook
Canadian Taxpayers Federation, Twitter

1990 establishments in Canada
Conservatism in Canada
Government watchdog groups in Canada
Taxpayer groups
Organizations based in Regina, Saskatchewan